Negombata magnifica, commonly known as toxic finger-sponge, is a species of sponge found from the Red Sea and the Indian Ocean. Negombata magnifica is extremely toxic because of the toxin latrunculin.

Negombata magnifica lives on shallow coral reefs in the northern waters of the Red Sea . Unlike many other species of sponges that live in abundance in these waters, preferring to grow between corals and rocks, or under them, Negombata magnifica grows in sight. The local fish won't touch it so it doesn't get damaged. When touched it releases a strongly smelling, reddish juice, which instantaneously makes all the fish flee away.

Negombata magnifica is grown artificially to harvest latrunculin.

References

Poecilosclerida
Sponges described in 1889